Kristofer Stivenson (born 4 October 1964) is a Greek swimmer. He competed in four events at the 1984 Summer Olympics.

References

1964 births
Living people
Greek male swimmers
Olympic swimmers of Greece
Swimmers at the 1984 Summer Olympics
Place of birth missing (living people)